A geocentric orbit or Earth orbit involves any object orbiting Earth, such as the Moon or artificial satellites. In 1997, NASA estimated there were approximately 2,465 artificial satellite payloads orbiting Earth and 6,216 pieces of space debris as tracked by the Goddard Space Flight Center. More than 16,291 objects previously launched have undergone orbital decay and entered Earth's atmosphere.

A spacecraft enters orbit when its centripetal acceleration due to gravity is less than or equal to the centrifugal acceleration due to the horizontal component of its velocity.

The rate of orbital decay depends on the satellite's cross-sectional area and mass, as well as variations in the air density of the upper atmosphere.

List of terms and concepts

Altitude as used here, the height of an object above the average surface of the Earth's oceans.
Analemma a term in astronomy used to describe the plot of the positions of the Sun on the celestial sphere throughout one year. Closely resembles a figure-eight.
Apogee is the farthest point that a satellite or celestial body can go from Earth, at which the  orbital velocity will be at its minimum.
Eccentricity a measure of how much an orbit deviates from a perfect circle. Eccentricity is strictly defined for all circular and elliptical orbits, and parabolic and hyperbolic trajectories.
Equatorial plane as used here, an imaginary plane extending from the equator on the Earth to the celestial sphere.
Escape velocity as used here, the minimum velocity an object without propulsion needs to have to move away indefinitely from the Earth. An object at this velocity will enter a parabolic trajectory; above this velocity it will enter a hyperbolic trajectory.
Impulse the integral of a force over the time during which it acts. Measured in (N·sec or lb * sec).
Inclination the angle between a reference plane and another plane or axis. In the sense discussed here the reference plane is the Earth's equatorial plane.
Orbital characteristics the six parameters of the Keplerian elements needed to specify that orbit uniquely.
Orbital period as defined here, time it takes a satellite to make one full orbit around the Earth.
Perigee is the nearest approach point of a satellite or celestial body from Earth, at which the orbital velocity will be at its maximum.
Sidereal day the time it takes for a celestial object to rotate 360°. For the Earth this is: 23 hours, 56 minutes, 4.091 seconds.
Solar time as used here, the local time as measured by a sundial.
Velocity an object's speed in a particular direction. Since velocity is defined as a vector, both speed and direction are required to define it.

Types
The following is a list of different geocentric orbit classifications.

Altitude classifications

The period of the orbit equals one sidereal day, coinciding with the rotation period of the Earth.
 High Earth orbit (HEO)  Geocentric orbits with altitudes at apogee higher than that of the geosynchronous orbit.

Inclination classifications
 Inclined orbit  An orbit whose inclination in reference to the equatorial plane is not 0.
 Polar orbit  A satellite that passes above or nearly above both poles of the planet on each revolution. Therefore it has an inclination of (or very close to) 90 degrees.
 Polar sun synchronous orbit  A nearly polar orbit that passes the equator at the same local time on every pass. Useful for image-taking satellites because shadows will be the same on every pass.

Eccentricity classifications
 Circular orbit  An orbit that has an eccentricity of 0 and whose path traces a circle.
 Elliptic orbit  An orbit with an eccentricity greater than 0 and less than 1 whose orbit traces the path of an ellipse.
 Hohmann transfer orbit  An orbital maneuver that moves a spacecraft from one circular orbit to another using two engine impulses. This maneuver was named after Walter Hohmann.
 Geosynchronous transfer orbit (GTO)  A geocentric-elliptic orbit where the perigee is at the altitude of a Low Earth Orbit (LEO) and the apogee at the altitude of a geosynchronous orbit.
 Highly elliptical orbit (HEO)  Geocentric orbit with apogee above 35,786 km and low perigee (about 1,000 km) that result in long dwell times near apogee.
 Molniya orbit  A highly elliptical orbit with inclination of 63.4° and orbital period of ½ of a sidereal day (roughly 12 hours). Such a satellite spends most of its time over a designated area of the Earth.
 Tundra orbit  A highly elliptical orbit with inclination of 63.4° and orbital period of one sidereal day (roughly 24 hours). Such a satellite spends most of its time over a designated area of the Earth.
 Hyperbolic trajectory  An "orbit" with eccentricity greater than 1. The object's velocity reaches some value in excess of the escape velocity, therefore it will escape the gravitational pull of the Earth and continue to travel infinitely with a velocity (relative to Earth) decelerating to some finite value, known as the hyperbolic excess velocity.
 Escape Trajectory  This trajectory must be used to launch an interplanetary probe away from Earth, because the excess over escape velocity is what changes its heliocentric orbit from that of Earth.
 Capture Trajectory  This is the mirror image of the escape trajectory; an object traveling with sufficient speed, not aimed directly at Earth, will move toward it and accelerate. In the absence of a decelerating engine impulse to put it into orbit, it will follow the escape trajectory after periapsis.
 Parabolic trajectory  An "orbit" with eccentricity exactly equal to 1. The object's velocity equals the escape velocity, therefore it will escape the gravitational pull of the Earth and continue to travel with a velocity (relative to Earth) decelerating to 0. A spacecraft launched from Earth with this velocity would travel some distance away from it, but follow it around the Sun in the same heliocentric orbit. It is possible, but not likely that an object approaching Earth could follow a parabolic capture trajectory, but speed and direction would have to be precise.

Directional classifications
 Prograde orbit  an orbit in which the projection of the object onto the equatorial plane revolves about the Earth in the same direction as the rotation of the Earth.
 Retrograde orbit  an orbit in which the projection of the object onto the equatorial plane revolves about the Earth in the direction opposite that of the rotation of the Earth.

Geosynchronous classifications
Such a satellite would trace an analemma (figure 8) in the sky.
 Geostationary orbit (GSO)  A geosynchronous orbit with an inclination of zero. To an observer on the ground this satellite would appear as a fixed point in the sky.
 Clarke orbit  Another name for a geostationary orbit. Named after the writer Arthur C. Clarke.
 Earth orbital libration points  The libration points for objects orbiting Earth are at 105 degrees west and 75 degrees east. More than 160 satellites are gathered at these two points.
 Supersynchronous orbit  A disposal / storage orbit above GSO/GEO. Satellites will drift west.
 Subsynchronous orbit  A drift orbit close to but below GSO/GEO. Satellites will drift east.
 Graveyard orbit, disposal orbit, junk orbit  An orbit a few hundred kilometers above geosynchronous that satellites are moved into at the end of their operation.

Special classifications
 Sun-synchronous orbit  An orbit which combines altitude and inclination in such a way that the satellite passes over any given point of the planet's surface at the same local solar time. Such an orbit can place a satellite in constant sunlight and is useful for imaging, spy, and weather satellites.
 Moon orbit  The orbital characteristics of Earth's Moon.

Non-geocentric classifications
 Horseshoe orbit  An orbit that appears to a ground observer to be orbiting a planet but is actually in co-orbit with it. See asteroids 3753 (Cruithne) and 2002 AA29.
  Sub-orbital flight  A launch where a spacecraft approaches the height of orbit but lacks the velocity to sustain it.

See also

 Earth's orbit
 List of orbits
 Orbital mechanics
 Celestial sphere
 Heliocentric orbit
 Areosynchronous orbit
 Areostationary orbit
 Escape velocity
 Satellite
 Satellite watching
 Space station

References

External links
Orbital speed
Medium Earth Orbit
NASA.gov
More Moons Around Earth? Its Not So Loony (archived 21 February 2010)
Near-Earth asteroid 3753 Cruithne – Earth's curious companion
Earth coorbital asteroid 2002 AA29